Kawkareik District (Phlone ; ; also called Dooplaya in Karen language) is a district of the Karen State in Myanmar. It consists of 4 towns; Kawkareik, the capital, Kyainseikgyi, Kyondoe, Payathonzu and Kyaikdon; and 552 villages. The population as 2014 was 475,191.

Townships
The district contains the following townships:
Kawkareik Township
Kyain Seikgyi Township

External links
 "Dooplaya under the SPDC" Karen Human Rights Group
November 23, 1998, Report KHRG #98-09

Districts of Myanmar
Kayin State